Christina Carpenter or Christine Carpenter was a 14th-century anchoress, also known as a religious recluse, in the village of Shere, Surrey, in southern England. She came to further notice when she left her cell which may well have been built for her in the church and wrote to the Pope to have herself readmitted.

Life
Carpenter was alive in the first half of the 14th century. Her father, William, was a carpenter and she came to notice in 1329 when on 21 June she asked permission of John de Stratford, who was then the Bishop of Winchester, to become an anchoress.

She wanted to become a living saint and she wanted to be walled up where she would remain until she died. The cell was attached to the church in Shere. The Bishop summoned the cleric Matthew Redemane, her father and several notables to swear to her good character and virginity. Within a month the Bishop had agreed and she would have been ceremoniously led to her cell on the north side of the chancel which had a communicating door. This door was to be opened only to allow her to take communion. It is believed that this cell may have been built for her use. An anchoress was to have her hair cut every three months and wear a veil and a habit; this presumably applied to Carpenter.

Carpenter took her place but as time went by she was found to be outside her cell and her vows. She was facing the spiritual danger of excommunication and the disappointment of all those who had spoken up for her character and integrity. Carpenter wrote to the Pope, who at the time was based in Avignon.

A letter exists from John Wrotham in Avignon to John de Stratford the Bishop, dated 6 August 1332. The letter records Carpenter's change of heart and her desire to re-establish her ambition to devote her life to that of a hermit. Wrotham had been appointed a papal penitentiary by John XXII at the request of Edward II. Bishop Wrotham advocates that Christine should be forgiven and received back into her former state. However it was agreed that she should suffer penance for her misbehaviour.

Second enclosure at Shere

The letters record that she should be now kept more securely and it is thought that this is the reason that the only doorway was replaced with a solid wall. The cell had two small openings into the church. The first was cruciform and it was intended to allow Carpenter to take communion. The other was a squint that allowed her to see out – but only in the direction of the church's altar. It is thought that there was a third window to the world, but this is no longer extant. This window would have been made too small for her to leave and its purpose would have been to allow her to be fed and watered and for her bodily wastes to be removed. It is not known what happened to Carpenter after this date, but the usual practice was to bury anchorites where they had lived and died. After an anchoress died, her cell would have been opened and a grave would be dug under her cell. Carpenter's remains may still be in that churchyard.

Death and legacy
Carpenter is presumed to have died in Shere. In 1333 John de Stratford became the Archbishop of Canterbury. Carpenter's story has been used as the basis for a number of pieces of literature. Sir Arnold Wesker wrote a play called Caritas based, in part, on this story. Wesker turned his play into a libretto for an opera on the same subject with music by Robert Saxton.

The movie "Anchoress" 1993, dir. Chris Newby, written by Judith Stanley-Smith and Christine Watkins, is based on the life of Christine Carpenter.

See also
Ascetical theology
Anchorite
Vestals (earlier, Roman parallel)

References

External links
 

1300s deaths
People from Surrey (before 1889)
English hermits
13th-century English people
14th-century English people
13th-century English women
14th-century English women
1329 births